Ginger dressing (also called sesame ginger dressing or sesame dressing) is an American salad dressing made with East Asian ingredients and intended to evoke East Asian cuisine. It is made with seasoned rice vinegar, minced garlic, minced onion, ginger, vegetable oil, scallions, sesame seeds, soy sauce, peppers, honey or corn syrup, and water.

Often served on salads at Japanese-American and Chinese-American restaurants, sesame ginger dressing is spicy and sweet.

Ingredients for a typical ginger dressing include: water, vegetable oil, sugar, soy sauce, garlic, onion, ginger, vinegar, and brown sugar.

See also
Wafu dressing
Asian cuisine

References

Salad dressings